Yidu is a city and former county in Hubei, China.

Yidu may also refer to:

Yidu County, Shandong (益都县), former name of Qingzhou City
Yidu, Fuqing (一都镇), town in Fujian
Yidu, Yongchun County (一都镇), town in Fujian
Yidu, Guangdong (义都镇), town in Longchuan County
Idu Mishmi language, or Yidu

See also
Idu script